Novokaltayevo (Yañı Qalta) is a rural locality (a village) in Muraptalovsky Selsoviet, Kuyurgazinsky District, Bashkortostan, Russia. The population was 118 as of 2010. There is 1 street.

Geography 
Novokaltayevo is located 48 km southwest of Yermolayevo (the district's administrative centre) by road. Krasny Mayak is the nearest rural locality.

References 

Rural localities in Kuyurgazinsky District